Wrigglesworth is an English surname. Notable people with the surname include:

Billy Wrigglesworth (1912–1980), English footballer
Brian Wrigglesworth (c. 1935 – 2015), rugby league footballer who played in the 1950s, 1960s and 1970s, and coached in the 1970s
Ian Wrigglesworth (born 1939), British politician
Ian Wrigglesworth (cricketer) (born 1967), Australian cricketer
Tom Wrigglesworth (born 1976), English stand-up comedian
Wrigglesworth, a member of the group Public Service Broadcasting

See also
Geoff Wriglesworth, English rugby league footballer of the 1960s and 1970s